is German for "Federal Police" and may refer to:

Federal Police (Germany)
Federal Police (Austria)